Frozen Kiss is a 2009 American drama film, supposedly based on a true story. It stars Cameron Goodman and Mimi Rogers.

Plot
The young couple consisting of Ryan and Shelley get stuck in a snow storm on their way home from a party. As they begin to walk, someone, or something, is coming after them.

Cast
Leslie Anne-huff
Tochukwu Onyenze

External links
 

2009 films
American horror drama films
2000s horror drama films
2009 drama films
2000s English-language films
Films directed by Harry Bromley Davenport
2000s American films